Washington's Birthday Marathon is an annual marathon in the United States that has been held nearly every February since 1962.

It is held each year on the Sunday of Washington's Birthday Weekend and is conducted by the DC Road Runners Club.

The race was originally held in Arlington, Virginia, but after a few years, it was moved to Beltsville, Maryland.  Finally, it was relocated to Greenbelt, Maryland.  The Greenbelt course started and finished at the recreation center of the NASA Goddard Space Flight Center and consisted of three loops around the Beltsville Agricultural Research Farm.  When NASA permanently closed access between the rec center and Good Hope Road, the race start was moved to Duvall High School, and finally to the Greenbelt Youth Center.  The race continues to consist of three loops on the farm.

A three-person relay is also held at the same time.

Past winners
Note: While the Washington's Birthday Marathon started in 1962, it was not until 1971 that women's finishes were recorded. In 1972 no female time was recorded. The marathon was cancelled in 2003, 2010, 2014, and 2015.
Source: Winners archive compiled by Jack Leydig, Juraj Gasparovic, George Banker, and Jay Jacob Wind.
Key:

References

External links
 Official website
 2008 website

Marathons in the United States
Greenbelt, Maryland
Tourist attractions in Prince George's County, Maryland
1962 establishments in Virginia
Recurring sporting events established in 1962